Golda's Balcony is a play by William Gibson.

It follows the trajectory of the life of Golda Meir from Russian immigrant to American schoolteacher to a leader of international politics as the fourth Prime Minister of Israel. Much of its focus is on the period surrounding the 1973 Yom Kippur War, when Israel was attacked by Egypt and Syria. Gibson's drama suggests Meir threatened Richard Nixon and Henry Kissinger with the launch of nuclear weapons against her enemies, conceivably starting World War III, unless the U.S. came to her country's aid.

Gibson first explored Meir in 1977 in his multi-character work Golda, which was produced on Broadway with Anne Bancroft in the title role. Never fully satisfied with the piece, he decided to tackle the subject matter, this time in the form of a one-woman play.

Golda's Balcony, produced by David Fishelson, opened Off-Broadway at Manhattan Ensemble Theatre ("MET") on March 26, 2003, where it sold out its entire 16-week run. Three months after closing Off-Broadway, the MET production, also starring Tovah Feldshuh and produced by Fishelson (directed by Scott Schwartz), opened on October 15, 2003 at the Helen Hayes Theatre, where it ran for 14 previews and 493 performances, making it the longest-running one-woman show in Broadway history.

Feldshuh was nominated for the Tony Award for Best Actress in a Play and won the Drama Desk Award for Outstanding Solo Performance.

In 2006 the play was adapted into a film of the same title, starring Valerie Harper.

In 2019 a 4-camera shoot of the play, starring Tovah Feldshuh was made into a film called Golda's Balcony, The Film (2019) for film festival exhibition only. By April 2019, this new film was in 24 announced film festivals in the United States.

The term "Golda's Balcony" refers to the nickname given to an area inside the secretive Dimona nuclear weapons facility from which visiting VIPs can observe some of the activity taking place in the underground portion of the facility.

References

External links 
 2019 FILM VERSION WEBSITE
 Internet Movie Database listing
 Internet Broadway Database listing
 Internet Off-Broadway Database listing
 New York Times feature

2003 plays
Plays by William Gibson (playwright)
Broadway plays
Plays for one performer
Plays set in the 1970s
Monodrama
Biographical plays about politicians
Israel in fiction
American plays adapted into films
Plays based on real people
Cultural depictions of Golda Meir